Tracktion (now known as Waveform) is a digital audio workstation for recording and editing audio and MIDI. The software is cross-platform, that runs on Apple macOS, Microsoft Windows, and Linux.

History
Tracktion was developed by independent UK designer/programmer Julian Storer, and released in 2002 by UK-based Raw Material Software. US-based Mackie is a division of LOUD Technologies specializing in studio recording and live sound products. It took over the distribution of Tracktion in 2003. It was sold in standalone, boxed retail versions and bundled with Mackie, Tapco, and Echo Audio computer-audio interfaces and digital-capable mixing boards.

Although no official word came from Mackie, the user's understanding was that Tracktion had been discontinued as the company issued no updates, communication, or announcements on it since January 2008. However, at the January 2013 NAMM show, Tracktion's original developer Julian Storer announced he had reacquired control of the software and would continue developing Tracktion with his new Tracktion Software Company.

User interface and unique features
Tracktion was designed to be transparent and intuitive. Track object controls and parameters are context-sensitive; effects, MIDI instruments, and other software objects can be added to tracks or even applied directly to individual audio and MIDI clips using a drag-and-drop system of filters. Complex chains of filters can be created, stored, and recalled for later use as rack effects, which can be thought of as analogous to a saved channel strip setting in a traditional DAW/sequencer.

Tracktion represented a move away from the modal dialog boxes, multiple menus, and cluttered windows common to most legacy MIDI sequencers and digital audio workstations, in favor of a streamlined, single-screen approach that presented the user with only the options they needed at any time, such as editing audio, adjusting MIDI automation parameters, and effects settings. In this way, Tracktion is often compared to Ableton Live. Although, Live has two separate work areas (Session and Arrange), Tracktion has fully context-sensitive windows that automatically appear or hide depending on the current tasks. Both are also notable for their more abstract visual styles, rather than trying to replicate "real world" recording equipment or effects boxes.

Tracktion's other innovations, later emulated by most other DAWs, were the development of "freeze", the ability to convert a MIDI instrument track to audio to free up RAM and CPU; and an inline MIDI editor that allowed MIDI to be edited in-track rather than in a separate window or dedicated editor. It was also the first DAW to adopt a fully vector-based, resizable interface.

Open source library
The underlying C++ code developed to create Tracktion's graphic and audio capabilities was later released as an open-source library, JUCE.

See also
Comparison of multitrack recording software
List of music software

References

External links

Audio editing software for Linux
Linux
Classic Mac OS software
Digital audio editors for Linux
Digital audio workstation software
Linux software
MacOS audio editors
Proprietary commercial software for Linux
Windows multimedia software